The flag of the Serbs of Croatia is the official symbol of the Serb national minority in Croatia. It was introduced into official use throughout the country on 9 April 2005 based on the decision of the Serb National Council, an elected political, consulting and coordinating body which acts as a form of self-government and autonomous cultural institution of the Serbs of Croatia. The council received consent of the Council for National Minorities of the Republic of Croatia before the decision. At the time of the statewide introduction, the flag was already officially used in Eastern Slavonia since the 14 November 1997 decision of the Joint Council of Municipalities made at the final stage of the UNTAES deployment in the region.

The flag of Serbs of Croatia is similar to the flag of the Republic of Serbia but has no coat of arms just like the flag of Republika Srpska. The flag was handed over to representatives of Serbian minority in Croatia by the Ambassador of Serbia in Croatia on 8 July 2005 at the ceremony organised to mark the occasion of the introduction of the flag, thereby giving it additional legitimacy in the Serbian community. 

While the Serb National Council as of 2021 never adopted the coat of arms of Serbs in Croatia the Joint Council of Municipalities in eastern Slaonia introduced it as well in 1997. In 2013 Milorad Pupovac stated that the new statewide joint Coat of Arms of Serbs in Croatia will probably contain symbols of the Military Frontier.

Flag protocol
The flag protocol is prescribed by the Serb National Council's Decision on the Flag of the Serbian National Minority in Croatia. The flag of Serbs of Croatia should be used in accordance with the decision and in a way that emphasize dignity and honor of the Serbian people. The flag is prohibited to stand in dilapidated, untidy, torn or in any other way damaged state.

History

The Tricolour flag appeared in 1835. Sretenje Constitution of Principality of Serbia described the colours of the Serbian flag as bright red, white and čelikasto-ugasita (that could be translated as steelish-dark). The constitution was criticised, especially by Russia, and the flag was specifically singled out as being similar to the revolutionary flag of France. Soon afterwards, Miloš Obrenović was requesting to the Porte that the new constitution should contain an article about the flag and coat of arms, and subsequent ferman (1835) allowed Serbs to use their own maritime flag, which will have "upper part of red, middle of blue, and lower of white", which is the first appearance of the colours which have remained until today.

Historically used flags

See also
 Serbs of Croatia
 Flag of Croats of Serbia
 Flag of Republika Srpska
 List of Serbian flags
 Pan-Slavic colours
 Flag of Italians of Croatia
 Ethnic flag

References

Flag
Ethnic flags